Karl Sigurbjörnsson (born 5 February 1947) is an Icelandic prelate who served as Bishop of Iceland from 1998 to 2012.

Biography
Karl is the son of Sigurbjörn Einarsson, Bishop of Iceland between 1959 and 1981 and his wife Magnea Thorkelsdóttir. Between 1962 and 1964 he went as an exchange student to Tacoma, Washington in the United States. He graduated from Reykjavík High School in 1967 and graduated in theology from the University of Iceland on 27 January 1973. He was ordained a priest on 29 January 1973. Between 1973 and 1975 he served as parish priest of the Landakirkja in Vestmannaeyjar. On 6 December 1974 he was appointed parish priest of Hallgrímskirkja in Reykjavík and was installed on 1 January 1975, a post he retained till 1997. Between 1977 and 1978 he served a pastoral ministry in Sweden while between 1988 and 1989 he studied in the United States. On 6 September 1997 he was elected Bishop of Iceland and was consecrated on 23 November that year. He was granted an honorary doctorate from the Faculty of Theology on 8 September 2000.

Personal life
Karl is the father of actor Guðjón Davíð Karlsson.

References 

1947 births
Living people
Karl Sigurbjörnsson
21st-century Lutheran bishops
Karl Sigurbjörnsson